Ed Miller is a Scottish folk singer. Born and raised in Edinburgh, Miller attended the University of Edinburgh for his undergraduate degree prior to moving to the United States in 1968 to complete his graduate work in geography and folklore at the University of Texas at Austin. Miller is the host of "Across the Pond"  on Austin's Sun Radio. He has worked with Brian McNeill, John Taylor, Scooter Muse, and Jil Chambless, and is a frequent performer at folk music festivals in the United States. Ed lives in Austin with his wife Nora, and has two daughters, Anna and Maggie.

Discography

Albums
 Scottish Voice (1993)
 [Live at the Cactus Cafe] (1995)
 At Home with the Exiles (1995)
 The Edinburgh Rambler (1997)
 Lowlander (2000)
 Many's The Fine Tale (2002)
 Generations of Change (2004)
 Never Frae My Mind (2006)
 Lyrics of Gold (2008)
 Come awa wi Me (2011)
 Border Background (2014)
 Follow the Music (2018)

External links
 Songs of Scotland

Living people
Scottish folk musicians
Scottish songwriters
Scottish folk singers
Scottish radio presenters
Scottish expatriates in the United States
Year of birth missing (living people)